Poverty in Niger is widespread and enduring in one of the world's most impoverished countries. In 2015, the United Nations (UN) Human Development Index ranked Niger as the second least-developed of 188 countries. Additionally, in 2015 the Global Finance Magazine ranked Niger 7th among the twenty-three poorest countries in the world. Two out of three residents live below the poverty line and more than 40 percent of the population earn less than $1 a day. Civil war, terror, illness, disease, poverty and hunger plague Niger. Hunger is one of the most significant problems the population faces daily.  With a national population of 19,899,120,  45.7% of this population live below the poverty line.

Food insecurity 

Representing nearly 35% of the population, an estimated 5.4 million citizens are food-insecure. Around 40% of children are underweight. Two and a half million people experience hunger and 800,000 children are malnourished. In January 2018, UNICEF flagged the terrorist insurgency of Boko Haram as a significant cause of the malnourishment of 400,000 children, labeling Niger as the world's most under-funded humanitarian crisis. Millions more are required humanitarian assistance after fleeing their homes. The agency warned that 90,000 children could die of Severe Acute Malnutrition in the coming year unless the international community took swift action. This amounts to more than 240 child deaths each day. The lack of food in Niger causes malnutrition and weakness, which often leads to infection and illness. One in four children dies before reaching age five. In 2015, ongoing floods, droughts, and temperature spikes attributed to climate change caused a severe food crisis compounded by water shortages.

Water crisis 
Niger is facing a water crisis affecting nearly 10 million people. 64.01% of rural areas lack access to water.

See also 
 Food insecurity in Niger
List of countries by percentage of population living in poverty

References 

Economy of Niger
Society of Niger
Niger
Niger
Social issues in Niger